Hanako-san, or , is a Japanese urban legend about the spirit of a young girl named Hanako-san who haunts school toilets. Like many urban legends, the details of the origins of the legend vary depending on the account; different versions of the story include that Hanako-san is the ghost of a World War II–era girl who was killed while playing hide-and-seek during an air raid, that she was murdered by a parent or stranger, or that she committed suicide in a school toilet due to bullying.

Legends about Hanako-san have achieved some popularity in Japanese schools, where children may challenge classmates to try to summon Hanako-san. The character has been depicted in a variety of media, including films, manga, anime, and video games, and not just as the notorious Hanako-san but in some as Hanako-kun, the male version.

The legend and its variations
According to legend, Hanako-san is the spirit of a young girl who haunts school toilets, and can be described as a yōkai or a yūrei. The details of her physical appearance vary across different sources, but she is commonly described as having a bobbed haircut and as wearing a red skirt or dress. The details of Hanako-san's origins also vary depending on the account; in some versions, Hanako-san was a child who was murdered by a stranger or an abusive parent in a toilet; in other versions, she was a girl who committed suicide in a school toilet; in still other versions, she was a child who lived during World War II and was killed in an air raid while hiding in a school toilet during a game of hide-and-seek. 

To summon Hanako-san, it is often said that individuals must enter a girls' toilet (usually on the third floor of a school), knock three times on the third stall, and ask if Hanako-san is present. If Hanako-san is there, she will reply with some variation of "Yes, I am." Depending on the story, the individual may then witness the appearance of a bloody or ghostly hand; the hand, or Hanako-san herself, may pull the individual into the toilet, which may lead to Hell; or the individual may be eaten by a three-headed lizard who claims that the individual was invading Hanako’s privacy.

History
Author and folklorist Matthew Meyer has described the legend of Hanako-san as dating back to the 1950s. Michael Dylan Foster, author of The Book of Yōkai: Mysterious Creatures of Japanese Folklore, has stated that Hanako-san "is well known because it is essentially an 'urban legend' associated with schools all over Japan. Since the 1990s, it has also been used in films, so it became part of popular culture ... not just orally transmitted or local folklore". In 2014, an article published by NPR described Hanako-san as having "become a fixture of Japanese urban folklore over the last 70 years".

In popular culture
The Hanako-san character has appeared in films, manga, anime, and video games. She made her first cinematic appearance in the 1995 film Toire no Hanako-san, directed by Joji Matsuoka, in which she is depicted as the benevolent spirit of a girl who committed suicide, and who haunts the toilet of a school. She was later depicted in the 1998 film Shinsei Toire no Hanako-san, directed by Yukihiko Tsutsumi, in which she is portrayed as a vengeful ghost who haunts the middle school that she attended before she died. She is also depicted in the 2013 film Toire no Hanako-san: Shin Gekijōban, directed by Masafumi Yamada.

Hanako-san appears in the manga series Hanako and the Terror of Allegory, written and illustrated by Sakae Esuno, as the roommate and friend of Daisuke Aso, a private detective who investigates urban legends. Hanako-san has also been depicted in the manga series Toilet-Bound Hanako-kun by Iro Aida—which debuted in 2014—in which the character is portrayed as a young boy. An anime television series adaptation of Toilet-Bound Hanako-kun produced by Lerche premiered in early 2020. Other anime series which feature the Hanako-san character include Kyōkai no Rinne, GeGeGe no Kitarō, and Ghost Stories. Hanako-san also appears in the anime and video game franchise Yo-kai Watch but is renamed Toiletta in the English versions. 

The Hanako-san legend was also incorporated into the 2020 young adult short story "Who's at the Door?".

See also
 Aka Manto ("Red Cape"), a Japanese urban legend about a spirit which appears in toilets
 Akaname, a Japanese yōkai said to lick the filth in bathrooms and bathtubs
 Bloody Mary, an urban legend about an apparition who appears in mirrors
 Madam Koi Koi, an African urban legend of a ghost who haunts schools
 Moaning Myrtle, a toilet-dwelling ghost in the Harry Potter book series
 Teke Teke, a Japanese urban legend about the spirit of a girl with no legs

References

Bibliography
 
 
 
 

Female legendary creatures
Japanese bathroom ghosts
Japanese urban legends